Mevagissey is a village, fishing port and civil parish in Cornwall, England, United Kingdom. The village is situated approximately five miles (8 km) south of St Austell. The parish population at the 2011 census was 2,015, whereas the ward population at the same census was 4,354.

The village nestles in a small valley and faces east to Mevagissey Bay. The inner and outer harbours are busy with a mixture of pleasure vessels and working fishing boats. It has a thriving fishing industry and is the second biggest fishing port in Cornwall.

Mevagissey village centre consists of narrow streets with many places to eat and shops aimed at the tourist trade. The outer areas are built on the steep slopes of the surrounding hillsides and are mostly residential.

History and toponymy

The first recorded mention of Mevagissey dates from 1313 (when it was known as Porthhilly), although there is evidence of settlement dating back to the Bronze Age.

The old name of the parish was Lamorrick, and it was part of the episcopal manor of Tregear. The church was dedicated to Saints Meva and Ida in 1259 by Bishop Bronescombe and in 1329 Sir Otho Bodrugan appropriated it to Glasney College. The Norman church was cruciform and some Norman work remains but the church was more or less rebuilt in the 15th century. In the Commonwealth period the tower became ruinous and the bells were taken down and sold to a Quaker of St Austell. According to tradition there has been a church on the same site since about 500 AD. Meva may well be the same as St Mewan and Issey is also the patron saint of St Issey.

Mevagissey is home to three holy wells. The Brass Well and Lady's Well are both situated in the manor of Treleaven, and the third is within the gardens of Mevagissey House, the old vicarage.

Towards the end of the 17th century, Porthhilly merged with the hamlet of Lamoreck (or Lamorrick) to make the new village. It was renamed "Meva hag Ysi", after two saints; St Mevan/Mewan, a Welsh man and an Irish woman, St Issey or Ida/Ita, (hag is the Cornish word for "and"). There is no evidence for why this new name was adopted but it may have been due to the Church replacing a Cornish name with a Christian one. The modern Cornish name is Lannvorek, after the old parish name. At this time the main sources of income for the village were pilchard fishing and smuggling and the village had at least ten inns, of which the Fountain and the Ship still remain.

Andrew Pears, the founder of Pears' Soap was born in the village in 1768 and set up a barber's shop here until he moved to London in 1789.

Governance & religion
Mevagissey civil parish was formed on 1 April 1983.  It fell under the then Borough of Restormel until its abolition in 2009, since when it has been under the Cornwall Council unitary authority.  The parish lies within the parliamentary constituency of St Austell and Newquay; it had previously been in the Truro and St Austell, & Truro constituencies.

It is in the Anglican diocese of Truro, the archdeaconry of Cornwall, and the deanery of St Austell.

Mevagissey harbour

The harbour is built on the site of a medieval quay. The first Act of Parliament allowing the new port to be built was passed in 1774. The inner harbour, consisting of the current East and West Quays, was constructed from this time. An outer harbour was added in 1888, but seriously damaged in a blizzard in 1891. The outer walls were rebuilt by 1897. The harbour was given charitable trust status in 1988.

The Royal National Lifeboat Institution (RNLI) stationed a lifeboat at Portmellon in 1869, but in 1888 moved it to Mevagissey. It was kept afloat in the harbour for a few years but in 1896 was moved into a purpose-built concrete boat house. The following year a new boat, the James Chisholm (RNLI number 403), was installed. This operated until 1930 when the station was closed. The neighbouring station at  had recently been equipped with a motor lifeboat and this could cover the coast around Mevagissey. The old boat house is now used as a local public aquarium and that at Portmellon has been converted into a house.

Mevagissey lighthouse was built in 1896 to mark the south breakwater that protects the small harbour.

In 1880 there were around sixty fishing-boats engaged in the mackerel fishery, and herring and pilchards were also important fisheries. Pilchards were also imported from Plymouth for curing at the Cornish Sardine Factory and the imported salt was also used for adding to butter at the same factory. Barley, grown nearby, was exported to Campbeltown, Scotland.

There are currently 63 registered fishing vessels in the harbour worked by 69 fishermen. The harbour also offers tourist fishing trips and there is a regular summer passenger ferry to Fowey.

Heligan
The Heligan estate is located on the steep slopes above Mevagissey, albeit mostly in the adjoining civil parish of St Ewe. The long term home of the Tremayne family, the estate is now best known as the location of the Lost Gardens of Heligan, a recently restored Victorian garden.

Mevagissey today
Each year at the end of June, Mevagissey celebrates Feast Week, a week of family fun, music, and floral dances through the streets.  At the end of the week there is a carnival and a fireworks display.

Mevagissey is within the Cornwall Area of Outstanding Natural Beauty (AONB) which along with National Parks, are considered to be the most special landscapes in the country and belong to an international family of protected areas. It is a designation aimed at conserving and enhancing the natural beauty of the area.

Healthcare
In May 2019 the sole partner at the Mevagissey GP surgery announced that she was handing back the contract, and villagers faced a trip to St Austell to see a doctor.

Hitler's Walk
A park in Mevagissey is popularly named Hitler's Walk by locals. Local folklore attributes this naming to the 1930s use of the park by a local councillor who was perceived to have displayed petty authoritarian tendencies; while others say it was because the home guard would patrol there looking for invasion forces from Germany. The park was the subject of controversy and national news headlines in September 2005 when signs bearing the name were removed after complaints to Restormel Borough Council, and again in January 2015 after the Mevagissey Parish Council decided to reinstate them. Harvey Kurzfield of Kehillat Kernow described the decision to restore the signage as "outrageous and completely unfeeling" and urged Jewish people to boycott the village. In February 2015 it was reported that the council had dropped the plans to reinstate the signs.

In popular culture
The writer Susan Cooper based two of her books (Over Sea, Under Stone and Greenwitch) in her well-known fantasy series The Dark Is Rising in Mevagissey (named 'Trewissick' in the books), where she used to holiday as a child. Mevagissey House is the vicarage from the first book 'Over Sea Under Stone', where Jane first meets the mysterious Mr Hastings.

The Wurzels wrote a song called "Mevagissey".

In an episode of the 1990s BBC children's television series Maid Marian and Her Merry Men, the Sheriff of Nottingham (played by Tony Robinson) says that "The country is suffering under the worst cold spell since King Arthur sat on The Magic Icicle of Mevagissey".

The inaugural episode of the popular BBC Two television cooking series Two Fat Ladies was filmed primarily in Mevagissey and the surrounding countryside.

Filming
Mevagissey is a popular location for filmmakers and advertisers.  It featured in The Next of Kin, 1942; Johnny Frenchman, 1945; Never Let Me Go, 1953; Dracula, 1979 and Bad Education, 2015.

References

External links

 
 Cornwall Record Office Online Catalogue for Mevagissey

Civil parishes in Cornwall
Villages in Cornwall
Ports and harbours of Cornwall
Fishing communities in England
Populated coastal places in Cornwall
Holy wells in Cornwall